Sir Robert Erskine Holland, KCIE, CSI, CVO (29 June 1873 – 30 September 1965) was an administrator in British India. A member of the Indian Civil Service and of the Indian Political Service, he was Agent to the Governor-General in Rajputana and Chief Commissioner of Ajmer-Merwara from 1919 to 1925.

The son of Sir Thomas Erskine Holland, Robert Holland was educated at Winchester College and Oriel College, Oxford. He entered the Indian Civil Service in 1895. 

In retirement, he was a member of the Council of India from 1925 to 1931, when he resigned at the beginning of his second five-year term. Having been called to the English bar in 1930, he was appointed Judicial Adviser to the Siamese Government, which carried membership of the Supreme Court of Siam. His term was not renewed in 1936, and received the Order of the Crown of Siam. He then settled in British Columbia, Canada.

References

Sources
 "Sir Robert Holland", The Times, 9 October 1965, p. 12
 "Sir Robert Holland", Western Daily Press, 22 April 1930, p. 7

External links 
 

1873 births
1965 deaths
Knights Commander of the Order of the Indian Empire
Companions of the Order of the Star of India
Commanders of the Royal Victorian Order
Indian Civil Service (British India) officers
Indian Political Service officers
Members of the Council of India
British expatriates in Canada
People educated at Winchester College
Alumni of Oriel College, Oxford
English barristers
Members of Lincoln's Inn
British expatriate judges
British expatriates in Thailand
British people in colonial India